Bexleyheath and Crayford is a constituency represented in the House of Commons of the UK Parliament since 2005 by David Evennett, a Conservative.

It was created in 1997 from parts of the former seats of Bexleyheath and Erith & Crayford.

Boundaries
1997–2010: The London Borough of Bexley wards of Barnehurst, Barnehurst North, Bostall, Brampton, Christchurch, Crayford, North End, St Michael's, and Upton.

2010–present: The London Borough of Bexley wards of Barnehurst, Brampton, Christchurch, Colyers, Crayford, Danson Park, North End, and St Michael's.

Boundary review
Following their review of parliamentary representation in South London, and as a consequence of changes to ward boundaries, the Boundary Commission for England recommended that part of Danson Park ward be transferred to Bexleyheath and Crayford from the constituency of Old Bexley and Sidcup; that part of Colyers ward be transferred from Erith and Thamesmead; and that parts of Lesnes Abbey ward, Belvedere ward, Northumberland Heath ward and Erith ward be transferred to Bexleyheath and Crayford from Erith and Thamesmead.

Constituency profile
Most of the seat consists of suburbs developed in the 20th century. There are four railway stations and many residents use these to commute to Central London. Bexleyheath is a large shopping and entertainment centre for the wider London Borough of Bexley.

Residents' health and wealth are in line with UK averages.

Members of Parliament
See Bexley, Bexleyheath and Erith and Crayford for related results from 1955 to 1997.

Election results

Elections in the 2010s

Elections in the 2000s

Elections in the 1990s

See also
List of parliamentary constituencies in London
David Evennett's website
Bexleyheath and Crayford Conservative Association website

Notes

References

External links 
Politics Resources (Election results from 1922 onwards)
Electoral Calculus (Election results from 1955 onwards)

Politics of the London Borough of Bexley
Parliamentary constituencies in London
Constituencies of the Parliament of the United Kingdom established in 1997
Bexleyheath